Girls' Night is a 1998 British comedy-drama directed by Nick Hurran. Loosely based upon the real experiences of writer Kay Mellor, the film stars Julie Walters and Brenda Blethyn as two sisters-in-law and best friends, one dying of cancer, who fulfil a lifelong dream of going to Las Vegas, Nevada, after an unexpected jackpot win on the bingo.

Premiered to a mixed response by critics at the 1998 Sundance Film Festival, who noted it a "rather formulaic tearjerker [with] two powerhouse Brit actresses", Hurran won a Silver Spire at the San Francisco International Film Festival and received a Golden Bear nomination at the 48th Berlin International Film Festival for his work.

Plot
Set in working class, northern England, Jackie Simpson and Dawn Wilkinson have been life-long best friends and in-laws, as Dawn is married to Jackie's brother. The two women work together side-by-side in a factory, and have a girls' night every Friday.

One Friday night, in the bingo hall while Jackie is fooling around with the manager Paul, Dawn wins the Bingo jackpot, 100,000 pounds. As they always split their winnings, Jackie is due to get 50,000, so she happily cleans out her things, leaving her husband a note with the keys, saying he can keep it. Jackie surprises her lover with her belongings, hoping to stay awhile.

The next day, clashing with the boss, Jackie gets sacked. Shortly after, Dawn collapses and is rushed to the hospital. Undergoing a barrage of tests, they discover she has cancer again (she'd had breast cancer years ago). He tells her they want to immediately put her on a course of radiation therapy. When her husband Steve picks her up, she says nothing, but arriving home, seeing her teenagers roughhousing, she inexplicably starts crying.

That Friday, the sisters-in-law go to the bingo party to collect the check. When asked what she'll do with the money, Jackie quips in the idea of a trip to Las Vegas. Her husband Dave brings her a document officially getting her off the mortgage. She finds out then that Dawn had been in hospital.

On Monday, Dawn is off the line at work and given a simpler task usually given to newbies, a more isolating job. Steve gives Jackie only 35,000 instead of the 50 Dawn had promised her. Dawn's second session of radio makes her vomit, and lose a bit of hair. She announces she's going to pack it in at work.

Jackie and Paul break it off when she discovers he's not been exclusive. He's frustrated that she had essentially moved in a month ago, which he hadn't wanted. Steve come across Jackie as she's wheeling away with her suitcases, looking for help with Dawn. Her hair is sparse and she looks terrible, but she refuses to admit to what's going on. Jackie marches down ti the hospital, insisting she speak with her doctor. She discovers that Dawn is now refusing more treatment, as it's not reducing her brain tumor.

Jackie pops by Dawn's, whisking her away to an adventure in Las Vegas. In her first few minutes at the slot machines, Dawn hits the jackpot. Not prepared for such a big payout,  Cody loans her his cowboy hat. She calls Steve that night to tell him they are having a blast in Las Vegas. Cody invites them to spend a day exploring Nevada on horseback. Beforehand, Dawn wins again at the roulette table, and after they split the $500+ Jackie chastises her for giving up.

Trail riding with Cody by his Nevada ranch, afterwards Jackie is dropped off at the hotel, and Dawn stays out for a bit as Jackie is hopeful she has a fling. She doesn't and decides she wants to end their trip.

Back at home, Jackie nurses Dawn, apologizes to Dave. She gives a eulogy at the funeral. At the wake in her home, the family finds gifts for them under the bed. Her message to Jackie from the grave is Cody's cowboy hat, so she returns to him in Nevada.

Cast
Julie Walters — Jackie Simpson
Brenda Blethyn — Dawn Wilkinson
Kris Kristofferson — Cody
Philip Jackson — Dave Simpson
George Costigan — Steve Wilkinson
Anthony Lewis — Mathew Wilkinson
Maxine Peake — Sharon
James Gaddas — Paul
Judith Barker — Helen
Sue Cleaver — Rita
Meera Syal — Carmen
Sophie Stanton — Jane
Fine Time Fontayne — Ken
Brent Huff — Bobby Joe
Nigel Whitmey — Tyrone
Kathryn Hunt — nurse

Reception
The film grossed £0.7 million ($1.2 million) in the United Kingdom and $1.5 million worldwide.

References

External links

1998 films
British comedy-drama films
1998 comedy-drama films
Films directed by Nick Hurran
Films scored by Edward Shearmur
Films shot in Greater Manchester
1990s female buddy films
British female buddy films
1990s English-language films
1990s British films